"High Voltage" is a song by Australian hard rock band AC/DC. It was first released in Australia as a single in July 1975, though it is the eighth track of their second Australian album T.N.T., the release itself was issued as a stand alone single. The song was written by Angus Young, Malcolm Young and Bon Scott, and peaked at #48 on the UK Singles Chart in 1980.

In January 2018, as part of Triple M's "Ozzest 100", the 'most Australian' songs of all time, "High Voltage" was ranked number 95.

Background
"High Voltage" shares its name with the band's first Australian and international albums. It is the ninth and final track on the international version, released in May 1976. "High Voltage" was also released as a single in the UK and various countries in Europe in 1976.

Although Phil Rudd is erroneously credited with recording the song, the drums were actually recorded by a session drummer Tony Currenti, not long after recording sessions for the debut album High Voltage.

"High Voltage" is one of AC/DC's most popular songs, and has been included on four of the band's five official live releases: If You Want Blood You've Got It (sung by Bon Scott, 1978), Live: 2 CD Collector's Edition (sung by Scott's replacement Brian Johnson, 1992), Live from the Atlantic Studios (Scott, 1977), and Let There Be Rock: The Movie – Live in Paris (Scott, 1979) – the latter two being released in 1997 as part of the Bonfire box set.

In concerts, this song has evolved into sing-a-long with the crowd. The bridge where Scott sings 'I said high, I said high', has been extended with Scott (and later Brian Johnson) repeating the word 'high' in increasing loudness and high pitch, to which the crowd responds with "high" louder also. That is followed by a backing rhythm for several minutes while Angus Young improvises on the on the guitar.

During the 2010 Black Ice World Tour, images of Scott were projected onto the stage screens during the performance of the song's chorus to commemorate the 30th anniversary of his death.

Personnel
Bon Scott – lead vocals
Angus Young – lead guitar
Malcolm Young – rhythm guitar, backing vocals
George Young – bass guitar
Tony Currenti – drums (uncredited)

Production
Producers – Harry Vanda, George Young

Charts

Weekly charts

Year-end charts

Notes

AC/DC songs
1975 singles
Songs about rock music
Songs written by Angus Young
Songs written by Bon Scott
Songs written by Malcolm Young
Song recordings produced by Harry Vanda
Song recordings produced by George Young (rock musician)
1975 songs
Albert Productions singles